The Investiture of Abbaton, the Enthronement of Abbaton, or the Encomium on Abbaton (alternatively spelled Abaddon;  Or. 7025), is an apocalyptic, pseudepigraphical, and apocryphal text. It describes the creation of Adam by God, Jesus, and the Holy Spirit; the fall of Satan; and the transformation of Muriel into Abbaton, the angel of death. The sole extant copy is dated to 981, and while its present version probably dates to the 700s, it may have an original from the 600s. It is purportedly written by Timothy of Alexandria.

Description and contents 
The Investiture of Abbaton has only one extant copy in the Sahidic dialect of Coptic. It is an apocalyptic text in the investiture genre. The surviving copy is dated to 981. While its present version likely dates to the 700s, an original may date to the 600s. The sole manuscript ( Or. 7025, CC 0405) was copied from another in Esna and donated to a church in Edfu, both in present-day Egypt. The text was inspired by the Testament of Abraham and is purportedly written by Timothy of Alexandria, though this attestation is false. In Severus ibn al-Muqaffaʿ's  (كتاب الإيضاح, 'explanation' or 'elucidation'), he attributes the Investiture of Abbaton to Theophilus of Alexandria (likely due to the close spellings of Timothy and Theophilus in Arabic), though which Theophilus he refers to is unclear. While scholar  writes that the story has a Muslim origin, this is also unclear, and Islamic angel of death stories (ʿIzrāʾīl) may have the same source material as the Investiture of Abbaton.

After an introduction by Timothy of Alexandria, six pages of which have been lost, the text describes the creation of Adam (including Jesus defending Adam to God, and his contribution to Adam's creation alongside the Holy Spirit and God), the fall of Satan (precipitated by a cherub), and the angel Muriel becoming Abbaton, the angel of death. Seven angels refuse to go to Eden to bring materials to form Adam because they predict the fall of man, but Muriel obliges; as a result, he is given control over the earth and humankind, and his name becomes Abbaton, the angel of death. He becomes a kind of king with a molten throne, similar to Hermetic and gnostic interpretations of demons and the Demiurge, respectively. It mentions John the Evangelist and responds to his questions about the angel of death.

Notes and references

Notes

Citations

Works cited

 
 
 
 

980s works
Christian apocalyptic writings
New Testament apocrypha related with Adam and Eve
Pseudepigraphy
Coptic literature